Thomas Fenoughty (7 July 1905 – 2001) was an English footballer.

Career
Born in Rotherham, Fenoughty started his career with Rotherham United in 1925. He was spotted playing Sunday School football in Rotherham and joined York City in 1927. York reluctantly parted company with him in 1934 as the club were facing financial difficulties, after having made 252 appearances and scoring 104 goals for the club. He was given a benefit match against Leeds United and offered to loan this benefit to the club. He joined Sheffield United in 1934. After making no league appearances for the club, he joined Rotherham United. He made 64 appearances and scored 22 goals in the league for them and joined Gainsborough Trinity.

References

1905 births
Footballers from Rotherham
2001 deaths
English footballers
Association football forwards
Rotherham United F.C. players
York City F.C. players
Sheffield United F.C. players
Gainsborough Trinity F.C. players
English Football League players
Midland Football League players